Major-General Sir Sydney D'Aguilar Crookshank  (3 June 1870 – 17 August 1941) was a British military engineer who served with the Royal Engineers in the British Army and the British Indian Army.  Most of his early career was spent in colonial service; he later served as a senior officer during the First World War.

As a temporary Lieutenant-Colonel he was Commander, Royal Engineers (CRE), of 47th (1/2nd London) Division on the Western Front from 30 July 1915 to 27 November 1916. On 21 May 1916 in the Vimy sector the Germans fired a mine and attacked the division's positions in overwhelming numbers. The situation was so critical for a while that Crookshank brought his Sappers of 47th (2nd London) Divisional Engineers up to man the trenches as infantry. He was awarded a Distinguished Service Order on 3 June 1916. Later, as a Major-General he was appointed Director-General (Transportation) of the British Armies in France on 19 March 1918.

After the war, Crookshank was appointed Honorary Colonel of 47th (2nd London) Divisional Engineers on 3 March 1923.

Notes

References
 Maj A.F. Becke,History of the Great War: Order of Battle of Divisions, Part 2a: The Territorial Force Mounted Divisions and the 1st-Line Territorial Force Divisions (42–56), London: HM Stationery Office, 1935/Uckfield: Naval & Military Press, 2007, .
 Maj A.F. Becke,History of the Great War: Order of Battle of Divisions, Part 4: The Army Council, GHQs, Armies, and Corps 1914–1918, London: HM Stationery Office, 1944/Uckfield: Naval & Military Press, 2007, .
 Brig-Gen Sir James E. Edmonds, History of the Great War: Military Operations, France and Belgium, 1916, Vol I, London: Macmillan,1932/Woking: Shearer, 1986, .
 Maj D.K. Edwards, A History of the 1st Middlesex Volunteer Engineers (101 (London) Engineer Regiment, TA) 1860–1967, London, 1967.
 Alan H. Maude (ed.), The History of the 47th (London) Division 1914–1919, London: Amalgamated Press, 1922/Uckfield: Naval & Military Press, 2002, .
 Who Was Who, A & C Black, an imprint of Bloomsbury Publishing plc, 1920–2014; online edn, Oxford University Press, 2014 ; online edn, April 2014 accessed 19 Aug 2014

1870 births
1941 deaths
Royal Engineers officers
Knights Commander of the Order of St Michael and St George
Companions of the Order of the Bath
Companions of the Order of the Indian Empire
Companions of the Distinguished Service Order
Members of the Royal Victorian Order
British Army major generals